The Nagoya Clock Tower is a clock tower in Los Angeles' Civic Center, in the U.S. state of California. The clock was gifted by the people of Nagoya to those of Los Angeles in 1984, on the 25th anniversary of the Sister City program.

See also 

 Los Angeles Sister Cities Monument, nearby fingerpost commemorating sister cities

References

External links
 

1984 establishments in California
Civic Center, Los Angeles
Clock towers in California